Borgolla is a village in the Torbeck commune in the Les Cayes Arrondissement, in the Sud department of Haiti.

References

Populated places in Sud (department)